Xinxing District is a district of the city of Qitaihe, Heilongjiang, People's Republic of China.

Administrative divisions
There are 17 subdistricts, 1 town and 1 township in the district.

Subdistricts:
 Xing'an Shequgonggongfuwuzhan, Xingle Shequgonggongfuwuzhan, Xingfu Shequgonggongfuwuzhan, Xingxiu Shequgonggongfuwuzhan, Xingping Shequgonggongfuwuzhan, Xinghe Shequgonggongfuwuzhan, Xingcheng Shequgonggongfuwuzhan, Xingsheng Shequgonggongfuwuzhan, Beishan Shequgonggongfuwuzhan, Xinyuan Shequgonggongfuwuzhan, Dongmei Shequgonggongfuwuzhan, Fengye Shequgonggongfuwuzhan, Anju Shequgonggongfuwuzhan, Henan Shequgonggongfuwuzhan, Xinli Shequgonggongfuwuzhan, Xincheng Shequgonggongfuwuzhan  and Gangyaogou Shequgonggongfuwuzhan()

The only town is Hongqi and the only township is    Zhangxing.

References

Administrative subdivisions of Heilongjiang